This is a list of fictional detective teams from popular detective fiction.  This list includes pairs or groups of characters who appear in a series of novels or short stories, not characters who are teamed only for a single story.

Where two detectives work together, they are listed as A and B; where a single detective is regularly accompanied by a non-detecting sidekick or chronicler they are listed as A with B.  The author who created the team appears in parentheses.

Detective Duos:

 Anabel and Looker – (Game Freak)
 Author Bryant and John May – (Christopher Fowler)
 Cool and Lam – (Erle Stanley Gardner as A. A. Fair)
Dalziel and Pascoe – (Reginald Hill)
Detective Pikachu/Harry Goodman and Tim Goodman – (Dan Hernandez, Benji Samit, Rob Letterman, Derek Connolly)
Frank and Joe Hardy – (Franklin W. Dixon)
Grijpstra and de Gier – (Janwillem van de Wetering)
Hawk and Fisher – (Simon Green)
Janet Scott and Rachel Bailey – (Sally Wainwright)
Jayanta and Manik – (Hemendra Kumar Roy)
Lord Darcy and Sean O'Lochlainn – (Randall Garrett)
Morse and Robert Lewis – (Colin Dexter)
Nero Wolfe and Archie Goodwin – (Rex Stout)
Nick and Nora Charles – (Dashiell Hammett)
Nick Wilde and Judy Hops – (Clark Spencer)
Richard Poole and Camille Bordey – (Robert Thorogood)
Shawn Spencer and Burton Guster – (Steve Franks)
Solomon and Lord – (Paul Levine)
 Thomson and Thompson  – (Georges Prosper Remi as Hergé)
 Tommy and Tuppence Beresford – (Agatha Christie)
 Travis McGee and Meyer – (John D. MacDonald)

Detective with X Duos:

Adrian Monk with Natalie Teeger – (Andy Breckman)
Arjun with Amal Shome – (Samaresh Majumdar)
Byomkesh Bakshi with Ajit Banerjee – (Sharadindu Bandyopadhyay)
Columbo with Dog – (Richard Levinson and William Link)
Dipak Chatterjee with Ratanlal – (Swapan Kumar)
Elijah Baley with R. Daneel Olivaw – (Isaac Asimov)
Feluda with Topshe – (Satyajit Ray)
Hercule Poirot with Arthur Hastings – (Agatha Christie)
Hildegarde Withers with Inspector Oscar Piper – (Stuart Palmer)
Inspector Lynley with Sergeant Havers – (Elizabeth George)
Kakababu with Sontu – (Sunil Gangopadhyay)
Kate Beckett with Richard Castle – (Andrew W. Marlowe)
Kiriti Roy with Subrata Roy – (Nihar Ranjan Gupta)
Martin Beck with Gunvald Larsson – (Sjöwall and Wahlöö)
Master Li with Number Ten Ox – (Barry Hughart)
Michael Knight with KITT – (Glen A. Larson)
 Mitin Masi with Tupur – (Suchitra Bhattacharya)
Niladri Sarkar with Jayanta  – (Syed Mustafa Siraj)
Parashor Barma with Krittibas Bhadra – (Premendra Mitra)
Phoenix Wright with Maya Fey – (Shu Takumi)
Shabor Dasgupta with Nanda – (Shirshendu Mukhopadhyay)
Sherlock Holmes with Dr. John H. Watson – (Sir Arthur Conan Doyle)
Sister Fidelma with Brother Eadulf – (Peter Tremayne)

Detective Groups:
Armed Detective Agency – (Kafka Asagiri)
Detective Boys – (Gosho Aoyama)
Mystery Incorporated  – (Hanna-Barbera)

Teams
Lists of groups of people